The 2022–23 season is Swindon Town's 144th year in their history and the club's second consecutive season in League Two. Along with League Two, the club also competed in the FA Cup, the EFL Cup and the EFL Trophy. The season covers the period from 1 July 2022 to 30 June 2023.

Managerial changes
On 30 May 2022, Ben Chorley resigned as the club’s director of football. On 6 June 2022, Sandro Di Michele was appointed Technical Director. On 8 June, head coach Ben Garner left the club to join League One side Charlton Athletic. On 20 June 2022, Assistant Manager Scott Lindsey was appointed as head coach. On 23 June 2022, assistant manager Scott Marshall left the club to join League One side Charlton Athletic. Later that day Jamie Day was appointed as assistant manager. On 11 January 2023, head coach Scott Lindsey and assistant manager Jamie Day left the club to join fellow League Two side Crawley Town. That same day, Gavin Gunning and Steve Mildenhall were appointed as co-interim head coaches. On 31 January 2023, Jody Morris was appointed as head coach. On 1 February 2023, Ex Swindon Town player Michael Doughty was appointed the club’s new Chief Sustainability Officer.

Pre-season

Swindon Town announced friendlies against Melksham Town, Swindon Supermarine, Woking, Eastleigh, Cardiff City and Worthing.

Competitions

EFL League Two

League table

Results summary

Results by matchday

Matches

Swindon Town's League Two fixtures were announced on 23 June 2022.

FA Cup

Town were drawn away to Stockport County in the first round.

EFL Cup

Town were drawn away to Walsall in the first round.

EFL Trophy

On 20 June, the initial Group stage draw was made, grouping Swindon Town with Bristol Rovers and Plymouth Argyle. On 23 June, Crystal Palace U21 was added to Group E.

Wiltshire Premier Shield

Town were drawn away to Chippenham Town in the quarter-final. Town were drawn away to Salisbury in the Semi-Final.

Transfers

In

Out

Loans in

Loans out

Squad statistics

Appearances

|-
|colspan="16"|Out on loan:

|-
|colspan="16"|No longer at the club:
|-

|-
|}

Awards

Team of the Week

Players

Management

Player of the Month

References

Swindon Town F.C. seasons
Swindon Town